The Bactrini are a tribe of tortrix moths.

Genera
Bactra
Henioloba
Parabactra
Syntozyga

References

 , 2008: New data on Bactrini (Lepidoptera, Tortricidae) from Africa. Norwegian Journal of Entomology 55: 7-13. Abstract: .
 , 2005: World catalogue of insects volume 5 Tortricidae.
 2006. Olethreutinae moths of Australia
 , 2012: Molecular data on the systematic position of Bactrini (Lepidoptera: Tortricidae). Genus 23 (1): 153-162. Full article: .

 

Moth tribes